Eldonnia is a monotypic genus of Asian dwarf spiders containing the single species, Eldonnia kayaensis. It was first described by A. V. Tanasevitch in 2008, and has only been found in Japan, Korea, and Russia.

See also
 List of Linyphiidae species (A–H)

References

Linyphiidae
Monotypic Araneomorphae genera
Spiders of Asia
Spiders of Russia